Anomoeotes tenellula is a species of moth of the Anomoeotidae family. It is known from Cameroon, Equatorial Guinea, Gabon, Sierra Leone and Togo.

References

Anomoeotidae
Moths of Africa
Moths described in 1893